Chibber is a surname. Notable people with the name include:

 Aloo Jal Chibber, Indian politician
 Gauri (Chibber) Khan (born 1970), Indian film producer and designer
 Manohar Lal Chibber (born 1927), Indian army officer and writer
 Om Prakash Chibber (1919–1998), Indian actor
 Priyanka Chibber, cast member of the Indian soap opera Rang Badalti Odhani
 Puru Chibber (born 1990), Indian actor
 Vibha Chibber, Indian actor
 Vivek Chibber (born 1965), Indian-American sociologist